Daryl Ng Win-kong, SBS, JP (born in 1978), is a Singaporean businessman and company director based in Hong Kong. He is the eldest son of Robert Ng, chairman of Sino Group and its subsidiaries. Daryl is deputy chairman of Sino Group, which comprises Sino Land, Sino Hotels and Tsim Sha Tsui Properties. He is also Chairman of Yeo Hiap Seng.

Early life and education
Ng was born at Queen Mary Hospital in Hong Kong. From his father's side, he is the grandchild of Ng Teng Fong, the founder of Sino Group. He is also the grandchild of Yeoh Ghim Seng from his mother's side. Ng attended the Diocesan Boys' School in his youth. He later studied in the United States, and graduated from Columbia University in 2001.

Business career
After graduation from university, Ng joined Sino Group, founded by his late grandfather, as a project manager. He was later appointed as an executive director in 2005.

In addition to day-to-day operations of Sino Group, Ng took charge of the Old Tai O Police Station project, which was converted into a nine-room boutique hotel, Tai O Heritage Hotel under Batch I of the Revitalising Historic Buildings Through Partnership Scheme of the Development Bureau. He told The New York Times that he hoped the project “..achieves three aspects: to allow visitors to experience the delights and charms of a local Hong Kong village, to appreciate the heritage and history of Hong Kong, as well as eco-tourism.”

Ng is the overall in-charge of the opening of The Fullerton Hotel Sydney, housed in the former Sydney General Post Office, a heritage-listed landmark in the heart of Sydney. The 416-room hotel heralds a new chapter of the much-loved landmark that has been integral to Sydney's development for more than a century.

He is also responsible for The Fullerton Heritage project (The Fullerton Hotel Singapore and associated buildings) in Singapore. The waterfront precinct comprises four historic buildings and three modern architecture; it has received a number of awards in heritage conservation and hospitality.

The HKSAR Government has awarded the Silver Bauhinia Star to him in recognition of his contributions to the community, in particular his work on heritage in Tai O and overseas.

Ng was appointed chairman of Yeo Hiap Seng on 1 January 2020.

In Hong Kong, he oversees the development of The Fullerton Hotel Hong Kong Ocean Park, which opened doors in July 2022.

Political career 
Ng is the member of the 12th and 13th Beijing Committee of the Chinese People's Political Consultative Conference; at the 10th Chinese People's Political Consultative Conference (2003 to 2008), Ng was a member of the Sichuan Committee.

Ng was one of the two deputy directors of Carrie Lam's 2017 Hong Kong Chief Executive election's campaign. He was also part of a three-member election campaign finance team for John Lee Ka-chiu's 2022 Hong Kong Chief Executive election campaign.

Ng is currently serving as a member of the Election Committee of Hong Kong for his second term since 2017.

Community work 
Ng is also known as a keen supporter of good causes.  He is seen in community services, green initiatives, heritage conservation, as well as arts and cultural events.  

Since 2013, he has been serving on the Spirit of Hong Kong Awards judging panel, an award paying tribute to Hong Kong's unsung heroes who have made a positive impact on others.

Ng has also worked on social and green innovations, driving projects like purification of food waste filtrate with micro-algae, in-building hydropower system and the award-winning City Air Purification System in collaboration with universities and engineering consultant Arup. Under his leadership, innovations such as wind turbines, in-building hydropower systems have been installed in Sino Group projects like Park Metropolitan and The Avenue. He has spearheaded a programme to recycle and upcycle felled trees into compost, mulch, fences and furniture.

To further the efforts to drive innovation, he established the Hong Kong Innovation Foundation in 2018. Positioned as a holistic innovation eco-system, the foundation caters to primary school through to start-ups and technology companies. It comprises programme like Go Code, Crazy Circuit and Robot Maker to teach pupil coding, circuit and robotics; OC STEM Lab to provide STEM activities and exposure for students and their parents; X Fair to showcase children's technological and scientific creations; university entrepreneurship competitions with the University of Hong Kong (DreamCatchers), the Hong Kong University of Science and Technology (HKUST-One Million Dollar Entrepreneurship Competition) and EIA Hong Kong; X-Lab to provide co-working space for start-ups and Sino Inno Lab to provide a sandbox platform for start-ups and technology companies to test out inventions and fine-tune with market feedback.

Public services
Ng also serves on the board of some public organisations, such as the M+ Board of the M+ Museum of the West Kowloon Cultural District, Hong Kong. The board is responsible for formulating the vision and mission, as well as the strategies, policies and guidelines in relation to museological matters and professional standards of operations for the museum. He also serves as a board member of the National Heritage Board, Singapore.

Personal life 
Ng is married with one son and two daughters. Ng has two younger brothers David Ng Win Loong and Alexander Ng Win Yew, both graduated from Columbia University.

References

Hong Kong businesspeople
Singaporean businesspeople
Hong Kong justices of the peace
Members of the Election Committee of Hong Kong, 2017–2021
Members of the Election Committee of Hong Kong, 2021–2026
Members of the 10th Chinese People's Political Consultative Conference
Members of the 12th Chinese People's Political Consultative Conference
Columbia College (New York) alumni
People educated at Diocesan Boys' School
Singaporean expatriates in Hong Kong
Singaporean people of Henghua descent
1978 births
Living people
Date of birth missing (living people)